My Claim is the debut solo album by American Hip hop artist Yak Ballz.  It was released on Feb 23, 2004 on Eastern Conference Records, with guest appearances from both Cage and Tame One.

Track listing

Notes and references

2004 albums
Yak Ballz albums
Eastern Conference Records albums